The Temptation of St. Thomas is a painting by the Spanish Baroque painter Diego Velázquez, executed in 1632 and housed in the Museum of Sacred Art of Orihuela Cathedral, southern Spain.

The work, for a period, was attributed to Murcian painter Nicolás de Villacis, until it was recognized as Velázquez's in the 1920s. It portrays the episode of the life of Saint Thomas Aquinas when, as a novice, he resisted the temptation represented by a prostitute, who is visible in the background door. The saint is held by an angel, while another is preparing to dress him with a white ribbon, representing chastity.

Temptation of St. Thomas is among Velázquez's better-known paintings.

References

Sources

External links
Velázquez , exhibition catalog from The Metropolitan Museum of Art (fully available online as PDF), which contains material on this painting (see index)

1632 paintings
Religious paintings by Diego Velázquez
Angels in art
Paintings in Spain
Prostitution in paintings
Books in art
Paintings of Thomas Aquinas